Bad Kösen station is a railway station in the spa town of Bad Kösen, located in the Burgenlandkreis district in Saxony-Anhalt, Germany.

References

Railway stations in Saxony-Anhalt
Buildings and structures in Burgenlandkreis